Mandip Singh Soin (born 9 March 1957) is a prominent Indian mountaineer, explorer, adventure travel expert, environmentalist, speaker and a Fellow of the Royal Geographical Society. He has spent over forty years in the field of adventure, having gone on expeditions to all the seven continents of the world. His mountaineering ascents and explorations include several Indian “firsts” like the first Indian ascent of Mount Meru in 1986 in the Himalayas as well as several first Indian ascents in the French and Swiss Alps, Italian Dolomites, Wales and Scotland. He is a strong advocate of responsible tourism and Founder President of the Ecotourism Society of India

Adventurer and Explorer 
At 14, Mandip started participating in climbing expeditions while he was studying at The Air Force School under Hari Dang, a well known educationist and a mountaineer. Later while studying at St. Stephen's College, Delhi and during his early climbing years, he started playing an activist’s role for several environmental causes along with his expeditions.

In 1979, he co-founded a national and international award-winning travel company, Ibex Expeditions Pvt. Ltd, offering adventure & safari travels in India and later also to the more discerning parts of the world. Through Ibex Expeditions, Mandip pioneered several unique journeys, such as the now famous frozen river (Chadar) trek on the Zanskar river in 1994, which paved the way for winter tourism in Ladakh and many more.

In 1988, he along with two team members, undertook a Mountain Rescue training project in North Wales, Scotland and Chamonix, under the aegis of an INLAKS Foundation grant. His team established a project called HELP (Himalayan Evacuation and Lifesaving Project) and Sir Edmund Hillary was patron of the project which helped reinforce Rescue systems in the Indian Himalaya.

He also undertook a cycling expedition from Delhi to Kathmandu in 1981. Led the first crossing on camel back of the Indian Thar desert from Jaisalmer to the Rann of Kutch in 1986, and the first elephant back expedition in the jungles of Kerala in 1990.

In 1992, he became the first Indian to be conferred the Ness Award for expeditions and exploration by the Royal Geography Society, UK.

In 1992, he was also nominated ‘Person of the Year’ and  'India's Most Versatile Adventurer' by Limca Book of Records

In 2012, he was conferred the highest civilian honor in India for Adventure by the President of India – the Tenzing Norgay National Adventure Award for Lifetime Achievement.

In 2015, he became the only Indian to be honored by the “Citation of Merit” from the famous Explorers’ Club, USA, at the 111th Explorers’ Club Annual Dinner.

Environmentalist 
Mandip has campaigned for the cause of environmental protection with concern for forests, wildlife, nature, communities and sustainable tourism in India. He is the Honorary Founder President of the Ecotourism Society of India, and former member of international committees such as the Pacific Asia Travel Association, Member of the World Travel Market Responsible Tourism Day's advisory panel and a Trustee of the Himalayan Environment Trust. For the last three decades, he has visited over 50 National Parks and sanctuaries all over India, Sri Lanka, South Africa etc. to assess the Ecotourism potential and lay out strategies for the Government & the tourism industry in India and worldwide. As Chairman of Pacific Asia Travel Association India Chapter's Environment & Ecotourism Committee, he was successful in getting the Indian travel industry to sign an environmental pledge in 1992.

Expeditions
 All India Rock Climbing Expedition, 1984.
 Led first crossing of the Thar desert on camel back, 1986.
 Member first Indian ascent of Mt Meru in the Garhwal Himalaya, 1986.
 Led first Elephant Expedition, Kerala, 1990.
 Led Indo British Frozen River Zanskar & Winter Expedition with Lord John Hunt as Patron, 1994. The expedition was awarded the Explorer's Club Flag and opened Tourism in winter for Ladakh.
 International Friendship Expedition: Indo Pakistan Friendship Expedition, in the Swiss Alps under the aegis of the World Conservation Union (IUCN) and the World Climbing & Mountaineering Federation (UIAA) 2002. Climbed Monch and championed the cause of creating the Siachen glacier between India and Pakistan, into a peace park.
 Led International Ecotourism & Volcano Expedition, Andaman and Nicobar Islands to present low impact tourism strategy as a sustainable option to the Government of India, 2003.
 River Ecotourism Expedition on the Chambal River with the Madhya Pradesh Ecotourism Board to convert local bandits to Naturalists, 2007.
9. Led adventure journeys in Bhutan 2006, Borneo 2006, Swiss Alps 2007, Arunachal Pradesh 2008, Mongolia 2009, Madagascar 2010, Peru 20

Morocco 2013, Namibia 2014, Chile 2015, Trans-Siberia 2016 and Antarctica 2017

Awards
India's Most Versatile Adventurer' by The Limca Book of Records 1992 and 2008.
The Ness Award by the Royal Geographical Society, UK 1992 for Mountaineering, Polar expeditions & encouragement of Youth exploration.
The International Institute for Peace Award for the Indo-Pakistan friendship expedition in the Swiss Alps 2002
'Arjuna Award of Adventure' – The Tenzing Norgay Lifetime Achievement National Award for Adventure 2012
Citation of Merit Award

Appointments and memberships

 Founder President, The Ecotourism Society of India. (ESOI)
Member, Board of Directors, Adventure Travel Conservation Fund (ATCF)
 Senior Vice-President, Adventure Tour Operators Association of India. (ATOAI)
 Trustee, Himalayan Environment Trust. (HET)
 Member, Judging Panel, Tourism for Tomorrow Awards, World Travel and Tourism Council
 Fellow, Royal Geographical Society, UK.
 Former Chairman, South Asia Chapter, Explorers Club USA
 Member, Indian Mountaineering Foundation (IMF)
 Member, Access & Conservation Committee, Union Internationale des Associations d'Alpinisme (UIAA)
 Member, International Committee of PATA for Sustainability and Social Responsibility.

References

Indian mountain climbers
Indian explorers
Living people
Recipients of the Tenzing Norgay National Adventure Award
1957 births